CSB is a South Indian film director who was born in Ummadahally a small village from Mandya district. With an academic qualification of B.Ed. from Bangalore University, M.Sc. in bioscience from Mysore University and a diploma in film technology from KANFIDA, he has worked as an associate with many directors including S. Narayan and Rajendra Singh Babu. He made his debut in 2013 with the film Aane Pataaki and rose to fame with the Kannada film Rathavara.

Filmography

References

External links
 

Film directors from Karnataka
Living people
Place of birth missing (living people)
Year of birth missing (living people)
People from Mandya district